The 1999 MTV Video Music Awards (stylized as 9999 MTV Video Music Awards) aired live on September 9, 1999, honoring the best music videos from June 13, 1998, to June 11, 1999. The show was hosted by Chris Rock at the Metropolitan Opera House in New York City. Ricky Martin was the most-awarded artist of the night, winning two primary awards for Best Pop Video and Best Dance Video, and three additional awards in the International Viewer's Choice categories for "Livin' la Vida Loca". Martin and Korn were the most nominated artists of the night, both with 9 nominations for their songs, "Livin' la Vida Loca" and "Freak on a Leash", respectively. Martin was also the first Latin artist in history to receive a nomination in Video of the Year category, but lost to "Doo Wop (That Thing)" by Lauryn Hill, which became the first Hip hop video to receive the award.

Highlights of the show included Diana Ross jiggling Lil' Kim's exposed breast in response to her outfit, which left her entire left breast uncovered, but for a small pastie on her nipple. The mothers of slain rappers Tupac Shakur and The Notorious B.I.G., Afeni Shakur and Voletta Wallace, came together to present the Best Rap Video Award. The Beastie Boys' Adam Horovitz made a plea for peace in the wake of the sexual assaults at Woodstock '99. Near the end of the night, MTV staged a tribute to Madonna, the most-nominated artist in VMA history, by presenting a host of male drag performers dressed as the singer in her past music videos. Rapper DMX was scheduled to perform but was a no-show; as a result, Jay-Z's solo set was extended. Another moment of the ceremony was the debut of Britney Spears performing her debut single "...Baby One More Time", and then, NSYNC, performed their song "Tearin' Up My Heart".

As Backstreet Boys came up and accepted their award for Viewer's Choice, a stranger came onto the stage and said, "Wake up at 3". This person was later revealed to be John Del Signore, who crashed the ceremony in a failed attempt to sell Viacom a show idea.

The awards show featured a line-up of sponsors and cross-promotions, most notably with SEGA, as the date of the show also coincided with the launch of their Dreamcast game console.

Background
After scouting locations in both New York and Los Angeles, MTV announced in May that the 1999 MTV Video Music Awards would be held at New York's Metropolitan Opera House at Lincoln Center. (MTV's traditional New York venue, Radio City Music Hall, was closed for renovations at the time.) Comedian Chris Rock was announced as the ceremony's host on June 30. Nominations were announced at a press conference hosted by Rock, Carson Daly, and Ricky Martin and held at Lincoln Center on July 28. For the first time, the ceremony was promoted with a "VMA Week" on Total Request Live, which would continue annually until that program's cancellation in 2008. The ceremony broadcast was preceded by the 1999 MTV Video Music Awards Opening Act. Hosted by Kurt Loder and Serena Altschul with reports from Chris Connelly, Carson Daly, Ananda Lewis, and John Norris, the broadcast featured red carpet interviews, a pre-taped interview with Trent Reznor, pre-taped features on Britney Spears' outfit selection and testing various singers' vocal ability to shatter glass, and performances from Smash Mouth and Blink-182.

Performances

Main show

Presenters

Pre-show
 Chris Connelly and Ananda Lewis – announced the winners of the professional categories and presented Best R&B Video.

Main show
 Moby – DJed during the commercial breaks
 Janet Jackson – presented Best Dance Video
 Puff Daddy and Denise Richards – presented Best Group Video
 Tom Green – appeared in vignettes about Viewer's Choice voting procedures
 Wyclef Jean and Charlotte Church – presented Best New Artist in a Video
 David Bowie – introduced Lauryn Hill
 Will Smith – introduced Afeni Shakur and Voletta Wallace and presented Best Rap Video with them
 Carson Daly and Pamela Anderson – described balloting procedures, and introduced the Backstreet Boys
 Gavin Rossdale and Susan Sarandon – presented Best Female Video
 Christina Aguilera and Tommy Lee – presented Best Rock Video
 Janeane Garofalo and Method Man – presented Breakthrough Video
 Mark McGrath and Jennifer Lopez – presented Best Video From a Film
 Johnny Depp – introduced Nine Inch Nails
 Limp Bizkit (Fred Durst and Wes Borland) and Heather Locklear – presented Best Pop Video
 Prince – introduced TLC
 Mira Sorvino and Freddie Prinze Jr. – presented Best Male Video
 Regis Philbin – introduced Fatboy Slim, Richard Koufey and the Torrance Community Dance Group
 Renée Zellweger and Jay Mohr – introduced the International Viewer's Choice Awards winners
 Stone Cold Steve Austin – introduced Jay-Z
 Buddy Hackett, Heather Donahue, Joshua Leonard and Michael C. Williams – presented Best Direction in a Video
 Mary J. Blige and Lil' Kim – introduced Diana Ross and presented Best Hip-Hop Video with her
 Rebecca Romijn-Stamos, Heidi Klum and Tim Robbins – presented Viewer's Choice
 Lars Ulrich – introduced Eminem
 Madonna – introduced Paul McCartney and presented Video of the Year with him

Winners and nominees
Winners are listed first and highlighted in bold.

See also
1999 MTV Europe Music Awards

References

External links
Official MTV site

1999
MTV Video Music Awards
MTV Video Music Awards